Michael Andrés Fuentes Vadulli (born 27 May 1998), also known as Vadulli, is a Chilean professional footballer who plays as a forward for Chilean Primera División side Audax Italiano.

Club career
In 2018, Fuentes joined Deportes Iquique from Colegio Deportivo CODE Iquique after being observed by the coach Jaime Vera and made his professional debut in a Chilean Primera División match against Palestino on April 21, 2018. After Deportes Iquique was relegated to Primera B, on 2021 season he was loaned to Audax Italiano on a deal for a year.

International career
Previous to his signing with Deportes Iquique, Fuentes represented the Chile national beach soccer team. In 16 November 2022, he made his international debut with the Chile national team in a friendly against Poland.

References

External links

Michael Fuentes at playmakerstats.com (English version of ceroacero.es)

1998 births
Living people
People from Iquique
Chilean footballers
Chile international footballers
Association football forwards
Deportes Iquique footballers
Audax Italiano footballers
Chilean Primera División players